Ha Jeong-yeon (born 19 May 1984) is a South Korean taekwondo practitioner. 

She won a gold medal in bantamweight at the 2003 World Taekwondo Championships in Garmisch-Partenkirchen, by defeating Nootcharin Sukkhongdumnoen in the semifinal, and Taylor Stone in the final.

References

External links

1984 births
Living people
South Korean female taekwondo practitioners
World Taekwondo Championships medalists
21st-century South Korean women